Ama Ata Aidoo, née Christina Ama Aidoo (born 23 March 1942) is a Ghanaian author, poet, playwright and academic. She was the Minister of Education under the Jerry Rawlings administration. In 2000, she established the Mbaasem Foundation to promote and support the work of African women writers.

Early life
Aidoo was born on 23 March 1942 in Saltpond in the Central Region of Ghana. Some sources including Megan Behrent, Brown University, and Africa Who's Who have stated that she was born on 31 March 1940. She had a twin brother, Kwame Ata.

She was raised in a Fante royal household, the daughter of Nana Yaw Fama, chief of Abeadzi Kyiakor, and Maame Abasema. She grew up at a time of resurgent British neocolonialism that was taking place in her homeland. Her grandfather was murdered by neocolonialists, which brought her father's attention to the importance of educating the children and families of the village on the history and events of the era. This led him to open up the first school in their village and influenced Aidoo to attend Wesley Girls' High School, where she first decided she wanted to be a writer.

Education 
Aidoo attended Wesley Girls' Senior High School in Cape Coast, from 1961 to 1964. After high school, she enrolled at the University of Ghana, Legon where she obtained the degree of Bachelor of Arts in English and also wrote her first play, The Dilemma of a Ghost, in 1964. The play was published by Longman the following year, making Aidoo the first published African woman dramatist.

Career 
Ama was appointed Minister of Education under the Provisional National Defence Council in 1982. She resigned after 18 months, realising that she would be unable to achieve her aim of making education in Ghana freely accessible to all. She has portrayed the role of African women in contemporary society. She has opined that the idea of nationalism has been deployed by recent leaders as a means of keeping people oppressed. She has criticized those literate Africans who profess to love their country but are seduced away by the benefits of the developed world. She believes in a distinct African identity, which she views from a female perspective.

She worked in the United States, where she held a fellowship in creative writing at Stanford University, California. She also served as a research fellow at the Institute of African Studies, University of Ghana, and as a lecturer in English at the University of Cape Coast, eventually rising there to the position of professor.

She has also spent a great deal of time teaching and living abroad for months at a time. She has lived in the United States, Britain, Germany and Zimbabwe.

In London in 1986, she delivered the Walter Rodney Visions of Africa lecture organised by the support group for Bogle-L'Ouverture publishing house. Aidoo taught various English courses at Hamilton College in Clinton New York, in the early mid-1990s. She is currently a visiting professor in the Africana Studies Department at Brown University.

Aidoo was a patron of the Etisalat Prize for Literature (alongside Dele Olojede, Ellah Wakatama Allfrey, Margaret Busby, Sarah Ladipo Manyika and Zakes Mda), created in 2013 as a platform for African writers of debut books of fiction. She obtained a Fulbright Scholarship award in 1988 and Mbari press short story prize.

Film
She is the subject of a 2014 documentary film, The Art of Ama Ata Aidoo, made by Yaba Badoe.

Writings
Aidoo's plays include The Dilemma of a Ghost, produced at Legon in 1964 (first published 1965) and Pittsburgh in 1988, and Anowa, published in 1971 and produced in London in 1991.

Her works of fiction particularly deal with the tension between Western and African world views. Her first novel, Our Sister Killjoy, was published in 1977 and remains one of her most popular works. It is notable for portraying a dissenting perspective on sexuality in Africa and especially LGBT in Africa. Whereas one popular idea on the continent is that homosexuality is alien to Africa, and an intrusion of the ideas of Western culture into a pure, inherently heterosexual "African" culture, Aidoo portrays the main character of Killjoy as indulging in lesbian fantasies of her own, and maintaining sympathetic relationships with lesbian characters.

Many of Aidoo's other protagonists are also women who defy the stereotypical women's roles of their time, as in her play Anowa. Her novel Changes won the 1992 Commonwealth Writers' Prize for Best Book (Africa). She is also an accomplished poet—her collection Someone Talking to Sometime won the Nelson Mandela Prize for Poetry in 1987—and has written several children's books.

She contributed the piece "To be a woman" to the 1984 anthology Sisterhood Is Global: The International Women's Movement Anthology, edited by Robin Morgan. Her story "Two Sisters" appears in the 1992 anthology Daughters of Africa, edited by Margaret Busby.

In 2000 she founded the Mbaasem Foundation, a non-governmental organization based in Ghana with a mission "to support the development and sustainability of African women writers and their artistic output", which she runs together with her daughter Kinna Likimani and a board of management.

Aidoo is the editor of the 2006 anthology African Love Stories. In 2012, she launched Diplomatic Pounds & Other Stories a compilation of short stories and another which is a collection of essays by renowned writers in Ghana, Africa and the African Diaspora.

Awards and recognition
Aidoo has received several awards including the 1992 Commonwealth Writers' Prize for Best Book (Africa) for her novel Changes.

The Aidoo-Snyder book prize, awarded by the Women's Caucus of the African Studies Association for an outstanding book published by a woman that prioritizes African women's experiences, is named in honour of Ama Ata Aidoo and of Margaret C. Snyder, who was the founding director of UNIFEM.

Launched in March 2017, the Ama Ata Aidoo Centre for Creative Writing (Aidoo Centre), under the auspices of the Kojo Yankah School of Communications Studies at the African University College of Communications (AUCC) in Adabraka, Accra, was named in her honour—the first centre of its kind in West Africa, with Nii Ayikwei Parkes as its director.

Selected works 
 The Dilemma of a Ghost (play), Accra: Longman, 1965. New York: Macmillan, 1971.
 Anowa (a play based on a Ghanaian legend), London: Longman, 1970. New York: Humanities Press, 1970.
 No Sweetness Here: A Collection of Short Stories, Longman, 1970.
 Our Sister Killjoy: or Reflections from a Black-eyed Squint (novel), Longman, 1977.
 Someone Talking to Sometime (a poetry collection), Harare: College Press, 1986.
 The Eagle and the Chickens and Other Stories (for children), Tana Press, 1986.
 Birds and Other Poems, Harare: College Press, 1987.
 An Angry Letter in January (poems), Dangaroo Press, 1992.
 Changes: a Love Story (novel), The Women's Press, 1991.
 The Girl Who Can and Other Stories, Heinemann African Writers Series, 1997.
 Diplomatic Pounds & Other Stories, Ayebia Clarke Publishing, 2012.

As editor
 African Love Stories: An Anthology, African Love Stories: An Anthology, Ayebia Clarke Publishing, 2006.

Further reading
 Aditya Misra, "Death in Surprise: Gender and Power Dynamics in Ama Ata Aidoo's Anowa". Journal of Drama Studies, Vol. 6, No. 1, 2012, pp. 81–91.
 Anne V. Adams (ed.), Essays in Honour of Ama Ata Aidoo at 70: A Reader in African Cultural Studies. Ayebia Clarke Publishing, 2012.
 Ada Uzoamaka Azodo and G. Wilentz, Emerging Perspectives on Ama Ata Aidoo, Africa Research & Publications, 1999.
 Vincent O. Odamtten, The Art of Ama Ata Aidoo: Polylectics and Reading Against Neocolonialism. University Press of Florida, 1994.
 Esther Pujolràs-Noguer, An African (Auto)biography. Ama Ata Aidoo's Literary Quest: Strangeness, nation and tradition, Lap Lambert Academic Publishing, 2012.
 Nafeesah Allen, "Negotiating with the Diaspora: an Interview with Ama Ata Aidoo", Scholar & Feminist Online, 2009.

References

External links

 Full-text, searchable works from Black Drama database.
 "AIDOO, Ama Ata", International Who's Who, accessed 1 September 2006.
 "Ama Ata Aidoo – Her Story" on BBC World Service.
 "Interview with Ama Ata Aidoo". Video interview by Michael Walling, artistic director of Border Crossings theatre company.
 "Ama Ata Aidoo on feminism in Africa - BBC HARDtalk", interview with Zeinab Badawi, 22 July 2014. YouTube.
 Kundai Mugwanda-Nyamutenha, "Women's History Month profile: Ama Ata Aidoo", This Is Africa, 30 March 2015.
 Suzanne Kamata, "A Profile of Ama Ata Aidoo", Literary Mama, February 2016.

1942 births
Living people
Ghanaian novelists
Ghanaian dramatists and playwrights
Ghanaian women novelists
Ghanaian women poets
Academic staff of the University of Cape Coast
Brown University faculty
Ghanaian expatriates in the United States
Government ministers of Ghana
20th-century novelists
20th-century Ghanaian poets
Women dramatists and playwrights
20th-century Ghanaian women writers
20th-century Ghanaian writers
20th-century Ghanaian educators
21st-century Ghanaian women writers
21st-century Ghanaian writers
Ghanaian feminists
Feminist writers
Ghanaian women short story writers
20th-century short story writers
21st-century short story writers
20th-century Ghanaian politicians
20th-century Ghanaian women politicians
Ghanaian women academics
Women government ministers of Ghana
20th-century women educators
Ghanaian twins
University of Ghana alumni